Paradamoetas is a genus of jumping spiders that was first described by George and Elizabeth Peckham in 1885. The name is a combination of the Ancient Greek "para", meaning "alongside", and the salticid genus Damoetas.

Species
 it contains four species, found in Central America, Canada, the United States, and Mexico:
Paradamoetas carus (Peckham & Peckham, 1892) – Mexico to El Salvador
Paradamoetas changuinola Cutler, 1982 – Panama
Paradamoetas fontanus (Levi, 1951) – USA, Canada
Paradamoetas formicinus Peckham & Peckham, 1885 (type) – USA to Nicaragua

References

Salticidae genera
Salticidae
Spiders of North America